The 2004 Sukma Games, officially known as the 10th Sukma Games was a Malaysian multi-sport event held in Negeri Sembilan from 29 May to 6 June 2004. Sarawakian swimmer Daniel Bego and Perakian swimmer Cindy Ong were announced as Best Sportsman and Best Sportswoman of the event respectively.

Development and preparation
The 10th Sukma Games Organising Committee was formed to oversee the staging of the event.

Venues
The 2004 Sukma Games used a mix of new and existing venues. Most venues were existing public-sporting facilities, while others were newly constructed venues. Some retrofitting work were done in venues which are more than a decade old. They will be revert to public use after the games.

At the centrepiece of the activities was the upgraded 45,000-seat Tuanku Abdul Rahman Stadium which hosts most of the events. A games village was not built, instead athletes and officials were housed in Universities, apartments and hotels throughout Negeri Sembilan. Besides being physically near to the sport venues, it was hoped that it will add vibe to the city and reduce post-games costs in converting a dedicated games village to other uses.

The 10th Sukma Games had 31 venues for the games. 22 in Seremban, 4 in Port Dickson, 3 in Kuala Pilah and 2 in Rembau.

Marketing

Logo

The Logo of the 2004 Sukma Games is a geometrically shaped image. 3 geometrical objects resembles the 3 athletes standing together to hold the torch up represents the Unity of Malaysia through sports concurrent to the Sukma Games objective, which is to improve unity and integration of nationality among the various communities in Malaysia . The three athletes also represent the Champion, Runner-up and Second runner-up position, which is the goal of every athlete. The Torch signifies the strength and competitive spirit of the athlete to achieve victory in every event. The four colours used in the games logo are Red which represents the Strength and Spirit to achieve victory, Yellow which represents the Sovereign Rights and Harmony in Negeri Sembilan, Blue which represents the Unity and National Integration and Black which represents the Traditional rule of Negeri Sembilan State under the "adat perpatih" norm.

Mascot
The Mascot of the 2004 Sukma Games is a nameless deer. It was a 'royalty hunt' in the Glory days of the Malay Sultanate of Malacca and now a symbol of Negeri Sembilan and one of the prevalent species in Malaysia. The mascot's adoption is meant to promote the state's eco-tourism.

The games

Participating states

 
 
 
 
 
 
 
 
 
 
 
 
 
 
 
  Police

Sports

 Aquatics

Medal table
A total of 1202 medals comprising 370 Gold medals, 368 Silver medals and 464 Bronze medals were awarded to athletes. The host Negeri Sembilan's performance was their best ever yet and was placed tenth overall among participating states.

Broadcasting
Radio Televisyen Malaysia was responsible for live streaming of several events, opening and closing ceremony of the games.

References

External links
 

Sukma
2004 in multi-sport events
Sport in Negeri Sembilan
Sukma Games